South Savo (or Southern Savonia;) is a region in the south-east of Finland. It borders the regions of North Savo, North Karelia, South Karelia, Kymenlaakso, Päijät-Häme, and Central Finland. The total area of South Savo is 18,768.33 km2 (7,246.5 sq mi), with a population of 153,738 (2011). South Savo is located in the heart of the Finnish lake district, and contains Lake Saimaa, the largest lake in Finland. The three major towns in the region are Mikkeli, Savonlinna and Pieksämäki.

Historical provinces 
For history, geography and culture see: Savonia

Municipalities 

South Savo includes 12 municipalities listed below (towns marked in bold).

 Enonkoski
Population: 
 Hirvensalmi
Population: 
 Juva
Population: 
 Kangasniemi
Population: 
 Mikkeli (S:t Michel)
Population: 
 Mäntyharju
Population: 
 Pertunmaa
Population: 
 Pieksämäki
Population: 
 Puumala
Population: 
 Rantasalmi
Population: 
 Savonlinna (Nyslott)
Population: 
 Sulkava
Population:

Politics 
Results of the 2019 Finnish parliamentary election in South Savo:

Centre Party  23.47%
Social Democratic Party  21.41%
National Coalition Party  18.39%
Finns Party  16.55%
Green League  9.47%
Christian Democrats  4.46%
Left Alliance  2.95%
Movement Now   1.42%
Blue Reform   0.85%
Seven Star Movement   0.40%
Other parties   0.63%

Cuisine 
The best known local cuisine is fried vendace, often served with potato puree, and a semicircle-shaped pastry called lörtsy.

References

External links 

South Savo Regional Council (official site).

 
Eastern Finland Province
Savonia, Southern